Samuel Wescott was the tenth Mayor of Jersey City. He succeeded David Stout Manners. Wescott served a single term from May 4, 1857 to May 2, 1858. He was succeeded by Dudley S. Gregory. Wescott served in the New Jersey State Senate from 1860 to 1862.

Wescott incorporated the "Mutual Benefit Life and Insurance Company of the County of Hudson" in 1860. His partners included Dudley S. Gregory, John Van Vorst, Edmund Kingsland, Garret Sip, John M. Cornelison, Hery F. Cox, Peter Bentley, Augustus A. Hardenburgh, and Jonathan D. Miller.

Wescott donated land in Cannelton (now Darlington), Pennsylvania for the construction of St. Rose Catholic Church c. 1861

References

External links
 Jersey City Mayors

Mayors of Jersey City, New Jersey
Democratic Party New Jersey state senators
Year of death missing
Year of birth missing